The Älplihorn is a mountain of the Albula Alps, overlooking Monstein in the canton of Graubünden, Switzerland.

References

External links
 Älplihorn on Hikr

Mountains of the Alps
Mountains of Graubünden
Alpine three-thousanders
Mountains of Switzerland
Davos